Côte-Nord-du-Golfe-du-Saint-Laurent is a municipality in the regional county municipality of Le Golfe-du-Saint-Laurent in the Côte-Nord region of the province of Quebec, Canada. The municipality consists of two non-contiguous areas, both along the shores of the Gulf of Saint Lawrence. The larger main part stretches from the Natashquan River to the Gros Mécatina River and includes all populated places. The eastern part is a small section between Middle Bay and Brador.

History
The Municipality of Côte-Nord-du-Golfe-Saint-Laurent was incorporated in 1963 and originally extended along the shores of the Saint Lawrence from the Natashquan River to the Newfoundland and Labrador provincial border, some  roughly corresponding to the Basse-Côte-Nord territory. However, with an isolated population scattered over a large area devoid of roads, the municipality did not have an elected municipal council and was managed by an appointed administrator headquartered in Chevery.

Starting in 1990, a restructuring plan was enacted that would carve up Côte-Nord-du-Golfe-Saint-Laurent into several additional municipalities. That year, the municipalities of Bonne-Espérance and Blanc-Sablon were formed, followed by the Municipality of Saint-Augustin on December 30, 1992, and finally the municipality of Gros-Mécatina on December 22, 1993.

On May 8, 1996, the municipality's name was officially adjusted to Côte-Nord-du-Golfe-du-Saint-Laurent.

Communities
The municipality includes the communities of Chevery, Harrington Harbour, Kegaska, and Tête-à-la-Baleine.

It also includes the following abandoned settlements and ghost towns, in order from west to east: Musquaro, Wolf Bay, Aylmer Sound, Ettamiau, Pointe Amouri, Barachois, Chez Menneau, and Boulet's (also known as Bully's).

Chevery

Chevery is the administrative centre of the municipality, located at the mouth of the Nétagamiou River. Its population in the Canada 2011 Census was 251.

Harrington Harbour

Harrington Harbour was founded near the end of the 19th century by fishermen from Newfoundland. The primary activity is commercial fishing for crabs, lobster, turbot, halibut, cod, and lumpfish.  Its population in the Canada 2011 Census was 261.

Kegaska

Kegaska is the westernmost community in the municipality. Its population in the Canada 2011 Census was 138, mostly anglophone settlers from Anticosti Island.

Tête-à-la-Baleine

Tête-à-la-Baleine, occasionally known as Whale Head in English, was settled in the 19th century after Michael Kenty bought the local trading post from the Labrador Company. Its population in the Canada 2011 Census was 129.

Musquaro
The ghost town of Musquaro is at the mouth of the Musquaro River, between Kegaska and La Romaine. Identified as Mascoüarou on Louis Jolliet's map of 1694, the name went through numerous spelling changes, such as Nasquirou, Maskouaro, and Mahkuanu. Its root meaning is "black bear tail" and may refer to the foothills of Mount Mascoüarou as shown Jolliet's map.

It was the site of a fortified trading post, established in 1710, and a catholic mission. In 1780, the post was on the territory granted to the Labrador Company of Quebec. 23 years later, the franchise went to the North West Company which in turn was sold to the Hudson's Bay Company in 1821. Closed for a brief time in 1859, the post remained occupied until 1925 after which it closed permanently.

Demographics 

Transportation
The municipality is served by three small local airports, Chevery Airport, Kegaska Airport and Tête-à-la-Baleine Airport. Harrington Harbour is served by a heliport, but does not have its own full airport.

Harrington Harbour is located on a small island which has no cars or roads, and all transportation in the community is by bicycle. Each mainland community has local road access — however, no roads currently connect one community to another, the entire municipality is isolated from the provincial highway network, and ferries or taxi boats must be used to travel between the communities or to the rest of the province.

In recent years the municipality has lobbied for Highway 138, which currently ends at Kégaska, to be extended through the area. The provincial government has announced a feasibility study, although no construction schedule has been announced to date.

Climate
Although located at the same latitude as Cornwall or Vancouver, the cold Labrador Current gives Côte-Nord-du-Golfe-du-Saint-Laurent a subarctic climate (Köppen Dfc), a little short of a humid continental climate (Dfb). In summer, maritime includes is much more pronounced than in winter and cools average July temperatures by about  compared to inland cities like Regina or Winnipeg.

Media
Two community radio stations, CFTH-FM-1 in Harrington Harbour and CJTB-FM in Tête-à-la-Baleine, operate in the municipality. CFTH also has rebroadcasters in Kegaska and Mutton Bay. The municipality is also served by rebroadcasters of Première Chaîne's CBSI-FM in Harrington Harbour and Tête-à-la-Baleine, and by a rebroadcaster of CBC Radio One's CBVE-FM in Harrington Harbour.

Télévision de Radio-Canada's CJBR-TV has rebroadcasters in Harrington Harbour and Tête-à-la-Baleine, and CBC Television's CBMT has a rebroadcaster in Harrington Harbour. The municipality does not receive any of Canada's commercial broadcast television networks, English or French, over the air.

Education
Commission scolaire du Littoral operates:
 Netagamiou School (anglophone and francophone) - Chevery
 Gabriel-Dionne School (francophone) - Tête-à-la-Baleine
 Harrington School (anglophone) - Harrington Harbour
 Kegaska School (anglophone) - Kegaska
 Marie-Sarah School for adults - La Romaine
 Its school program for children was suspended in 2014. It was formerly a francophone school.

See also
 List of municipalities in Quebec

References

External links 

The Lower North Shore
Tourism Lower North Shore

Municipalities in Quebec
Incorporated places in Côte-Nord